Paracingulina is a genus of sea snails, marine gastropod mollusks in the family Pyramidellidae, the pyrams and their allies.

Species
Species within the genus Paracingulina include:
 Paracingulina inequicingulata (Nomura, 1938)
 Paracingulina onzikuensis (Nomura, 1938)
 Paracingulina quatericingulata (Nomura, 1938) 
 Paracingulina terebra (Dunker, 1860) 
 Paracingulina triarata (Pilsbry, 1904)

References

External links
 To World Register of Marine Species

Pyramidellidae
Monotypic gastropod genera